The poundal (symbol: pdl) is a unit of force, introduced in 1877, that is part of the Absolute English system of units, which itself is a coherent subsystem of the foot–pound–second system.

The poundal is defined as the force necessary to accelerate 1 pound-mass at 1 foot per second per second.
1 pdl =  exactly.

Background 
English units require re-scaling of either force or mass to eliminate a numerical proportionality constant in the equation F = ma. The poundal represents one choice, which is to rescale units of force. Since a pound of force (pound force) accelerates a pound of mass (pound mass) at 32.174 049 ft/s2 (9.80665 m/s2; the acceleration of gravity, g), we can scale down the unit of force to compensate, giving us one that accelerates 1 pound mass at 1 ft/s2 rather than at 32.174 049 ft/s2; and that is the poundal, which is approximately  pound force.

For example, a force of 1200 poundals is required to accelerate a person of 150 pounds mass at 8 feet per second squared:

The poundal-as-force, pound-as-mass system is contrasted with an alternative system in which pounds are used as force (pounds-force), and instead, the mass unit is rescaled by a factor of roughly 32. That is, one pound-force will accelerate one pound-mass at 32 feet per second squared; we can scale up the unit of mass to compensate, which will be accelerated by 1 ft/s2 (rather than 32 ft/s2) given the application of one pound force; this gives us a unit of mass called the slug, which is about 32 pounds mass. Using this system (slugs and pounds-force), the above expression could be expressed as:

Note: Slugs and poundals (1/) are never used in the same system, since they are opposite solutions of the same problem.

Rather than changing either force or mass units, one may choose to express acceleration in units of the acceleration due to Earth's gravity (called g). In this case, we can keep both pounds-mass and pounds-force, such that applying one pound force to one pound mass accelerates it at one unit of acceleration (g):

Expressions derived using poundals for force and lb for mass (or lbf for force and slugs for mass) have the advantage of not being tied to conditions on the surface of the earth. Specifically, computing F = ma on the moon or in deep space as poundals, lb⋅ft/s2 or lbf = slug⋅ft/s2, avoids the constant tied to acceleration of gravity on earth.

Conversion

See also 
Slug (unit)

References
 Obert, Edward  F., “Thermodynamics”, McGraw-Hill Book Company Inc., New York 1948; Chapter I, Survey of Dimensions and Units, pages 1–24.

Units of force
Imperial units
Customary units of measurement in the United States